Sun Creature is the second EP by stoner rock band Nebula. The album is compared to Fu Manchu's Eatin' Dust (also released on Man's Ruin) stating that there are many "similarities" in the sound and energy of it. Some CD copies of the EP contain a nine-minute bonus track entitled "Fly On". A shortened "re-mixed" copy of the song can be heard on Dos EPs compilation. It is out of print.

Track listing

Notes
"Fly On" appears as a bonus track on some releases.

Personnel
Eddie Glass – Guitars, vocals, percussion
Ruben Romano – Drums, vocals
Mark Abshire – Bass

Credits
Tracks 1&3 recorded at Private Radio, Seattle, WA 8/98 by Jack Endino
Produced by Nebula & Jack Endino
Tracks 2&4 recorded at Loho Studios, NYC 6/98 by Joe Hogan
Produced by Nebula & Joe Hogan
All music by Eddie Glass
All lyrics by Eddie Glass & Ruben Romano
1998 Volcanic Pineapple ASCAP
Sleeve Assembly by Frank Kozik 1999

Sources
AMG []
Nebula's website

References

Nebula (band) EPs
1999 EPs
Man's Ruin Records EPs
Albums produced by Jack Endino